Vladimir Barbu (born 7 August 1998 in Cles, Italy) is an Italian diver.
 
Trained by Giorgio Cagnotto, he placed 15th at the 2017 World Aquatics Championships in Budapest, finishing fifteenth in the diving competition from the 10 metre platform ,

Barbu also represented Italy in the men's 10 metre platform event at the 2016; 2017, and 2018 European aquatics championships; placing respectively in the 15th, 5th, and 9th positions in the aforementioned yeats.

Barbu also models.

References

1998 births
Italian male divers
Italian people of Romanian descent
Living people
European Games competitors for Italy
Divers at the 2015 European Games